A drawbridge mentality is the attitude of people who have migrated to a more exclusive or more "unspoiled" community and then campaign to preserve the tranquility of that community by opposing further inward migration by people or businesses and, possibly, any development or refurbishment, including plans put forward by those already located there. The term can imply a selfish attitude and can be taken as an insult by people who have strong affection for their home locality and wish to protect it from any changes. It is closely related to the NIMBY attitude. There are many factors that can lead to a person developing a drawbridge mentality, and two of the factors are quality of place and migration. When new people migrate into an already populated area, they often bring with them new ideas and practices. Sometimes, the original population is upset with this change and wants to keep things how they were. These individuals “reject change and work to preserve the status quo, adopting a `drawbridge mentality”. This can impact the sustainability of a place, based on the idea of sudden change. Two major examples of locales developing a drawbridge mentality are Anaheim Hills, California in 1994 and currently in Acton, Massachusetts.

Factors

Quality of place 
Throughout history when places change for the better or worse, “Local actors respond in diverse ways to impending change”. Some changes may include cultural, political, economical, or environmental changes which may have an impact on the locals. Locals may see it as their quality of place changing since “some reject change and work to preserve the status quo, adopting a `drawbridge mentality”. This is based on the idea that change will lower the quality of the area. “...Each place offers a unique bundle of amenities, and most people consciously locate themselves in places they prefer, all things considered. If the bundle of amenities changes, as when a rural community sub-urbanized, then some residents will become unhappy” . When locals of an area feel as though the quality of place of their home is being threatened by change, it can result in certain individuals developing this drawbridge mentality.

Migration 
Migration is a large factor and driving force of locals having a drawbridge mentality because individuals migrating into new places affects the local way of life in these new places in some way. Migration occurs for many reasons, and some of these reasons are, “millions of persons faced with dehumanizing poverty, shooting wars, or ecological collapse find all their previous means of livelihood vanishing”. There are also other “environmental factors related to economic and political activities that may motivate people to move”. Individuals who are influenced to migrate due to factors such as these move to new places and they tend to bring the livelihood and lifestyle that they are accustomed to with them, and inhabitants of the land that they are migrating to may not be fond of this if they have a drawbridge mentality. “In the countries of the North, a "moat and drawbridge" mentality is becoming pervasive, keeping those governments from addressing problems in home countries and providing humane remedial measures”.

Examples

Anaheim Hills, California 
An example of a drawbridge mentality occurring in the Western Hemisphere in the last 3 decades is what occurred in Anaheim Hills in 1994. The city wanted to move “a half-way house for abused children that has a proven, celebrated track record” to Anaheim Hills. They very quickly “tried to block the arrival of the Eli House and disregarded all the evidence to the contrary and raised their “Not in My Back Yard” flag, saying that the abusers of these new and needy neighbors will fill up their streets”. When the plan to move the half-way home to Anaheim Hills got approved “many of the residents of the expensive Anaheim Hills area moved from more urban areas in an effort to leave some problems behind”. Yet now “the facility helps more than 1,000 clients a year, most of them young people who have suffered emotional, physical or sexual abuse”. The drawbridge mentality of these locals in Anaheim caused them to pick up and move because they thought that bringing this halfway house into their town would disrupt the typical way of life that they were used to.

Acton, Massachusetts 
In Acton Massachusetts, they are currently going through the process of working through the Housing Production Plan. This is happening because “in the years since 1969, Boston’s housing crisis has worsened, and its suburbs are as exclusive as ever”. Their past housing plans “had at least the effect of increasing the value of land and making it harder for people with low income to find opportunity for housing in the town”. It has become clear over the last decade “narratives of racism often center on the virulent actions of a few prejudicial citizens and officials”. Through the past decade in Acton it has become clear locales and local governments are trying to keep low income and people of color secluded from their neighborhoods. Yet they must “fulfill the requirement in Chapter 40B to have 10% of its housing be designated “affordable””. This is why the new Housing Production Plan had to be put into place. One of the locales from Acton states, ““the drawbridge mentality” stems from a rational response by homeowners seeking to protect their largest asset”. Another states, “drawbridge mentality, it's like ‘I've moved in, and then I become vocal about changing the zoning bylaws so that nobody else can come in".

Impacts of sustainability 
Drawbridge mentality exemplifies the relation between sustainability and geography. The individuals coming in and moving the locals out of their new founded community are sustaining their culture and the resources within the land they took over. This creates pockets of wealth and poverty based on how the resources are used. If one group comes in and takes all the resources it could cause unsustainable practices within the area thus leading to possible effects on the economy, environment, and society as a whole. Economy and the environment are very closely related in terms of the way in which they impact individuals and the larger community. “Environmental factors may be linked to making a livelihood, and in this way, they can influence the economy of survival. When resources are diminished to the point where livelihoods may not be maintained, the economy of survival is weak.” . These two variables are placed on a fine line in which one small change can create a large reaction. With the factors involved in drawbridge mentality, the economy and environment are constantly affected.

See also

 Not in my backyard

References 

 "ORANGE COUNTY PERSPECTIVE : That Drawbridge Mentality". Los Angeles Times. 1994-07-16. Retrieved 2022-10-12.
 Andrews, Clinton J (April 2001). "Analyzing Quality-of-Place". Environment and Planning B: Planning and Design. 28 (2): 201–217. doi:10.1068/b2714. ISSN 0265-8135 – via SAGE Publications Inc.
 O'Lear, Shannon (June 1997). "Migration and the Environment: A Review of Recent Literature". Social Science Quarterly. 78 (2): 606–618 – via JSTOR.
 Cheng, Michael; Dayal, Prisha; Raman, Anjali; Vijay, Neha. "The Drawbridge Mentality - Exclusion and Escapism in Acton, Massachusetts". The Spectrum. Retrieved 2022-10-12.

Sustainability
Political terminology
Cognitive inertia